The PowerBook G3 is a series of laptop Macintosh personal computers designed, manufactured, and sold by Apple Computer from 1997 to 2001. It was the first laptop to use the PowerPC G3 (PPC740/750) series of microprocessors, and was marketed as the fastest laptop in the world for its entire production run.  The PowerBook G3 was succeeded by the PowerBook G4.

The G3 was the first black Apple laptop, and was succeeded in this by the black MacBook in 2006. Previous PowerBooks were dark gray.

Macintosh PowerBook G3 (Kanga)
The first Macintosh PowerBook G3, code-named "Kanga," was introduced in November 1997. At the time of its introduction, the PowerBook G3 was advertised as the fastest notebook computer available (a title formerly held by its predecessor, the 240 MHz PPC-603ev-based PowerBook 3400c). This model was based on the PowerBook 3400c, and was unofficially known as the PowerBook 3500. It used the same case as the 3400c, and a very similar motherboard. The motherboard was upclocked from 40 MHz to 50 MHz, resulting in some incompatibility with older 3400 RAM modules. Other changes to the motherboard included doubling the on-board RAM from 16 MB to 32 MB, and a faster version of the on-board Chips and Technologies graphics controller. The G3 made the Kanga more than twice as fast as a 3400c, and the improved graphics controller allowed it to refresh the screen 74 percent faster.

This first PowerBook G3 shipped with a 250 MHz G3 processor and a 12.1" TFT SVGA LCD. It is the only G3 system that is not officially compatible with Mac OS X (though various methods not sanctioned by Apple can be used to install OS X). The Kanga was on the market for less than 5 months, and is largely regarded as a stopgap system that allowed Apple to ship G3 PowerBooks sooner, while Apple prepared its more revolutionary PowerBook G3 Series. As a result, the Kanga has the dubious distinction of being Apple's most quickly deprecated PowerBook. Nevertheless, many people chose to purchase a Kanga to continue using their interchangeable expansion bay modules, batteries, and other peripherals from the Powerbook 190, 5300 and 3400 models. The Kanga was also notably smaller in depth and width than the subsequent Wallstreet Powerbooks, and the Kanga remained the smallest-when-open G3 laptop until the debut of the Apple iBook some years later.

PowerBook G3 Series (Wallstreet I)

The second generation of PowerBook G3s, now called the PowerBook G3 Series, was introduced in May 1998. The machine was completely redesigned with a new case that was lighter and more rounded than the previous PowerBook G3; however, it was still an Old World ROM Macintosh. The new PowerBooks, code-named Wallstreet, came in three screen sizes: a 12" passive matrix LCD, a 13.3" TFT LCD, and a 14.1" TFT LCD. The Wallstreet was the first PowerBook to use industry-standard ATA optical drives. This change meant that CD and DVD recorders designed for Wintel machines could more easily be used in this computer, often at a price far less than those manufactured by Apple. It also came in three CPU speeds: 233 MHz, 250 MHz, and 292 MHz. The 233 MHz model was sometimes nicknamed Mainstreet, as it lacked L2 cache, making it far slower than the other two in the lineup. The 250 MHz and 292 MHz models shipped with 1 MB of cache. Because of this large cache, as well as the swifter system bus, the Wallstreets were known to suffer from some heat issues. Many of the problems of the Wallstreet PowerBook G3s were fixed in the next revision, the Wallstreet II.

PowerBook G3 Series (Wallstreet II, PDQ - "Pretty Darn Quick")
The Wallstreet design was updated in August 1998 (Wallstreet-II). It featured a 14.1" display on all models. Processor speeds were bumped on the faster two models, resulting in 233 MHz, 266 MHz, and 300 MHz models. The case contained two docking bays, one on each side. The left-hand bay could accommodate a battery, a 3.5" floppy disk, a third-party Iomega Zip drive, or a third-party add-on hard drive. The right-hand bay was larger and could accommodate any of the above plus a 5.25" optical drive (CD-ROM or DVD-ROM). A small internal nickel-cadmium battery allowed swapping of the main batteries while the computer "slept." With a battery in each bay, battery life was doubled. DVDs could be displayed with the use of a hardware decoder built into a CardBus (PCMCIA) card. The PowerBook G3 Series was Apple's first notebook offering that matched the build-to-order customization of the Power Mac G3 desktop line. Discontinued in May 1999, this would be the last Apple computer ever to bear the rainbow-colored Apple logo and the last Mac to support Apple's Superdrive. It was also the last Old World ROM model in the PowerBook series. The PDQ was the last PowerBook assembled by Apple in Cork, Ireland.

PowerBook G3 Bronze Keyboard (Lombard) 
The third generation of PowerBook G3 (Lombard) was introduced in May 1999. It was much slimmer and lighter than its predecessor and was the first New World ROM PowerBook. It had longer battery life, and as with the Wallstreet II the user could double the duration to 10 hours by substituting a second battery for the optical drive in the expansion bay. The keyboard was also improved and now featured translucent bronze-tinted plastics, which is the origin of the "bronze keyboard" nickname. It was also the first Apple laptop with a backlit Apple logo on the rear of the display.

Internal hard drives for the Pismo, Lombard, and Wallstreet II can be used interchangeably. The expansion bay drives (DVD, CD, floppy, battery) are interchangeable on the Pismo and Lombard, but not on the Wallstreet. A DVD drive was optional on the 333 MHz model and standard on the 400 MHz version. The 400 MHz model included a hardware MPEG-2 decoder for DVD playback, while the 333 MHz model was left without (except for the PC card one used by Wallstreet). Further DVD playback optimizations enabled both models to play back DVDs without use of hardware assistance. This model introduced USB ports to the PowerBook line while retaining SCSI support and eliminating ADB entirely (although the keyboard and touchpad still used an ADB interface internally). Graphics were provided by an ATi Rage LT Pro chipset on the PCI bus, to drive its 14.1-inch LCD at a maximum resolution of 1024×768.

Mac OS 8.6–10.3.9 are supported by Apple, but 10.4 is not, although OS X will not install (except for 10.0) if both RAM slots are not occupied with identical size RAM. The use of XPostFacto 4 allows users to upgrade to Tiger, and it runs quite well for an unsupported machine. More RAM (up to 512 MB), a greater hard drive (up to 128 GB), and CPU upgrades (up to a 433 MHz G4) are available for these PowerBooks.

PowerBook G3 FireWire (Pismo)
The fourth generation of PowerBook G3 (Pismo), was introduced in February 2000. It was code named "Pismo" after the City of Pismo Beach, California. For this generation Apple dropped "G3" from the name.

The original Pismo was rumored to be a latchless design, akin to the iBook, which is similar in specification. Apple settled on fitting the Pismo board into the form factor of the previous Lombard G3 PowerBook, but with many improvements. The Pismo was available at CPU speeds of 400 MHz or 500 MHz, with a front side bus speed of 100 MHz (one-third swifter than the Lombard's front side bus); it also implemented a unified motherboard architecture, and replaced SCSI with the newer FireWire interface (IEEE-1394). The PCI graphics used on the Lombard were updated to an AGP-connected ATi Rage Mobility 128, though the video memory was kept at 8 MB, and could not be upgraded, and the screen's resolution was the same as well. A 6× DVD-ROM drive became standard. It was also the first PowerBook with AirPort networking as an official option (although it could be added to the earlier models via various third-party CardBus cards). The Pismo can be upgraded with additional RAM (officially 512 MB with then-available RAM, but it accepts 1 gigabyte) and a larger hard drive (up to 128 GB). Brighter screens and replacement batteries were also available.

The left expansion bay, like the Lombard, could only take a battery, but the right bay was able to accommodate a tray-loading or slot-loading Combo Drive or SuperDrive, a Zip 100 drive, a Zip 250 drive, an LS-120 SuperDisk drive, a VST floppy disk drive, a second hard drive (with adapter, which was tough to find), or a second battery. Lombard and Pismo accept the same expansion bay devices.

Versions of Mac OS from 9.0.2 through 10.4.11 are officially supported. For some time, G3 (750FX) CPU upgrades at speeds of up to 900 MHz and G4 (7410LE) upgrades up to 550 MHz were available. These upgrades are now out of production and must be purchased secondhand.

The Pismo PowerBook was the last of the G3 line. It was succeeded by the PowerBook G4 Titanium models.

Technical specifications

In popular culture
The PowerBook G3 was featured in many facets of popular culture from the late 1990s to the mid 2000s, including You've Got Mail, NewsRadio, Curb Your Enthusiasm, Austin Powers: The Spy Who Shagged Me, House on Haunted Hill, Mission: Impossible, Disney's The Kid, Dark Angel, What Women Want, The West Wing, Friends, The Lone Gunmen, The Core, Duplex, Saw, Sex and the City, How I Met Your Mother, Night at the Museum, Charmed, Everybody Loves Raymond, Stargate SG-1, That's So Raven and Angel.

Timeline

References

External links

 Apple Support
  (Original / Kanga)
 
 
 How to Identify Different Models  at Apple.com
 Portable Mac index via Lowendmac
 Pictures of Pismo internals, via pbfixit.com
 Powerbook G3 PDQ, Powerbook Pismo 500mHz via Forevermac.com

G3
PowerPC Macintosh computers
Computer-related introductions in 1997